Mududi is a village in Arsikere taluk of Hassan district in India.

Location
Mududi is located on the highway between Channarayapatna and Arsikere in Hassan district of Karnataka state in India.

PIN code
There is a post office in Mududi and the postal code is 573119.

Demographics
The total population of the village is 1,306.

Image gallery

See also
 Shravanabelagola
 Shravaneri
 Arsikere
 Channarayapatna
 Munjenahalli
 Gandasi Handpost

References

Villages in Hassan district